Abduction is the debut studio album of Alien Faktor, released in 1994 by Decibel.

Reception

John Bush of Allmusic awarded Abduction three out of five possible stars, saying "Thomas Muschitz blends soundtrack-inspired music with electronic dance on this Decibel release." Sonic Boom praised the use of musical cacophony and diversity of the album.

Track listing

Personnel
Adapted from the Abduction liner notes.

Alien Faktor
 Tom Muschitz – vocals, programming, arrangements, engineering, mixing

Additional musicians
 Tom Crawford – arrangements
 Kevin Gayton – vocals (6)
 Mike Hunsberger – guitar (2, 8, 11, 14), programming (14), sampler (14)
 Terry Reed (as Warlock) – vocals and engineering (3)
 Jordan Trais – Roland TB-303 (11)

Production and design
 Guy Aitchison – cover art, painting
 Matt Hawley – design

Release history

References

External links 
 Abduction at Discogs (list of releases)

1994 debut albums
Alien Faktor albums
Decibel (record label) albums